This is a list of places in Estonia which have standing links to local communities in other countries known as "town twinning" (usually in Europe) or "sister cities" (usually in the rest of the world).

A
Anija
 Salo, Finland

Antsla
 Uusikaupunki, Finland

E
Elva
 Salo, Finland

H
Häädemeeste

 Hankasalmi, Finland
 Karmøy, Norway
 Mjölby, Sweden
 Salacgrīva (Limbaži), Latvia

Haapsalu

 Eskilstuna, Sweden
 Fundão, Portugal

 Haninge, Sweden
 Hanko, Finland
 Ikšķile, Latvia
 Rendsburg, Germany
 Uman, Ukraine

Haljala

 Laboe, Germany
 Pyhtää, Finland
 Schönberg, Germany

Harku

 Eura, Finland
 Piaseczno, Poland

Hiiumaa

 Neukloster-Warin, Germany
 Norrtälje, Sweden
 Pargas, Finland
 Virolahti, Finland

J
Järva
 Kokkola, Finland

Jõgeva

 Jonava, Lithuania
 Kaarina, Finland
 Karlstad, Sweden
 Kaišiadorys, Lithuania
 Keuruu, Finland
 Makariv Raion, Ukraine
 Ungheni, Moldova
 Valozhyn District, Belarus

Jõhvi

 Kingisepp, Russia
 Loimaa, Finland
 Ogre, Latvia
 Skien, Norway
 Thisted, Denmark
 Uddevalla, Sweden

K
Kadrina
 Janakkala, Finland

Kambja
 Toivakka, Finland

Keila

 Barsbüttel, Germany
 Birštonas, Lithuania
 Chiatura, Georgia
 Huittinen, Finland
 Kerava, Finland
 Sigulda, Latvia

Kohtla-Järve

 Kėdainiai, Lithuania
 Kingiseppsky District, Russia
 Korostyshiv, Ukraine
 Norderstedt, Germany
 Outokumpu, Finland
 Salihorsk, Belarus

 Slantsevsky District, Russia
 Staffanstorp, Sweden
 Veliky Novgorod, Russia
 Wyszków, Poland

Kose

 Iława, Poland
 Ócsa, Hungary
 Pagėgiai, Lithuania

Kuusalu
 Sipoo, Finland

M
Maardu

 Białogard, Poland
 Bijelo Polje, Montenegro

 Chornomorsk, Ukraine
 Elektrėnai, Lithuania
 Frunzyenski (Minsk), Belarus
 Jēkabpils, Latvia
 Kalininsky (Saint Petersburg), Russia
 Khabarovsk, Russia
 Klaipėda District Municipality, Lithuania
 Krasnoarmeysky (Volgograd), Russia
 Myrhorod, Ukraine
 Myshkin, Russia
 Ostashkov, Russia
 Pikalyovo, Russia
 Prince George, Canada
 La Seyne-sur-Mer, France
 Sihanoukville, Cambodia
 Ulaanbaatar, Mongolia
 Vanadzor, Armenia
 Velikiye Luki, Russia

Märjamaa

 Cesvaine, Latvia
 Łącko, Poland
 Raahe, Finland
 Vara, Sweden

Muhu
 Utajärvi, Finland

N
Narva

 Bălți, Moldova
 Barysaw, Belarus
 Bel Air, United States
 Donetsk, Ukraine
 Elbląg, Poland
 Gorna Oryahovitsa, Bulgaria
 Ivangorod, Russia
 Kanta-Häme, Finland
 Karlskoga, Sweden
 Kingiseppsky District, Russia
 Kirovsky (Saint Petersburg), Russia
 Kobuleti, Georgia
 Lahti, Finland
 Petrozavodsk, Russia
 South-Western AO (Moscow), Russia

Narva-Jõesuu

 Imatra, Finland
 Kronstadt, Russia

Nõo
 Viitasaari, Finland

O
Otepää

 Ekerö, Sweden
 Ostrovsky District, Russia
 Tarp, Germany
 Toksovo, Russia
 Vihti, Finland

P
Paide

 Annaberg-Buchholz, Germany
 Fredensborg, Denmark
 Håbo, Sweden
 Hamina, Finland
 Havířov, Czech Republic
 Jämijärvi, Finland
 Mažeikiai, Lithuania
 Pereiaslav, Ukraine
 Saldus, Latvia
 Westminster, United States

Pärnu

 Gran, Norway
 Helsingborg, Sweden

 Jelgava, Latvia
 Ocean City, United States
 Oskarshamn, Sweden
 Portsmouth, United States
 Šiauliai, Lithuania
 Siófok, Hungary
 Södertälje, Sweden
 Vaasa, Finland

Põhja-Pärnumaa

 Alajärvi, Finland
 Ostrów Mazowiecka (rural gmina), Poland
 Rundāle, Latvia
 Pakruojis, Lithuania
 Uggiate-Trevano, Italy

Põhja-Sakala

 Fladungen, Germany
 Hajnówka, Poland
 Hône, Italy
 Iszkaszentgyörgy, Hungary
 Jokioinen, Finland

 Nora, Sweden
 Ukrainka, Ukraine
 Ulvila, Finland

Põltsamaa

 Kokemäki, Finland
 Mänttä-Vilppula, Finland
 Skrunda, Latvia
 Sollefteå, Sweden

Põlva is a member of the Charter of European Rural Communities, a town twinning association across the European Union. Põlva also has three other twin towns.

Charter of European Rural Communities
 Bienvenida, Spain
 Bièvre, Belgium
 Bucine, Italy
 Cashel, Ireland
 Cissé, France
 Desborough, England, United Kingdom
 Esch (Haaren), Netherlands
 Hepstedt, Germany
 Ibănești, Romania
 Kandava (Tukums), Latvia
 Kannus, Finland
 Kolindros, Greece
 Lassee, Austria
 Medzev, Slovakia
 Moravče, Slovenia
 Næstved, Denmark
 Nagycenk, Hungary
 Nadur, Malta
 Ockelbo, Sweden
 Pano Lefkara, Cyprus
 Samuel (Soure), Portugal
 Slivo Pole, Bulgaria
 Starý Poddvorov, Czech Republic
 Strzyżów, Poland
 Tisno, Croatia
 Troisvierges, Luxembourg
 Žagarė (Joniškis), Lithuania
Other
 Balvi, Latvia
 Strugi Krasnye, Russia
 Ukmergė, Lithuania

R
Rakvere

 Cēsis, Latvia
 Lappeenranta, Finland
 Lapua, Finland
 Lütjenburg, Germany
 Sigtuna, Sweden
 Panevėžys, Lithuania
 Senaki, Georgia
 Szolnok, Hungary
 Vyshhorod, Ukraine

Räpina

 Gulbene, Latvia
 Kangasala, Finland
 Kulykivka, Ukraine
 Pechory, Russia

Rapla

 Braslaw, Belarus
 Kaiserslautern (district), Germany
 Nurmijärvi, Finland
 Raseiniai, Lithuania

Rõuge

 Alūksne, Latvia
 Vesilahti, Finland

S
Saaremaa

 Gotland, Sweden
 Talsi, Latvia

Saku

 Liperi, Finland
 Saku, Japan
 Strängnäs, Sweden
 Sund, Åland Islands, Finland
 Tukums, Latvia
 Ylöjärvi, Finland

Saue

 Inčukalns, Latvia
 Montemarciano, Italy
 Quincy-sous-Sénart, France
 Sollentuna, Sweden

Sillamäe

 Brovary, Ukraine
 Bützow, Germany
 Havre de Grace, United States
 Mstsislaw, Belarus
 Nekrasovsky District, Russia

T
Tallinn

 Annapolis, United States
 Dartford, England, United Kingdom
 Ghent, Belgium
 Groningen, Netherlands
 Kiel, Germany
 Kyiv, Ukraine
 Kotka, Finland
 Malmö, Sweden
 Riga, Latvia
 Schwerin, Germany
 Venice, Italy
 Vilnius, Lithuania

Tallinn – Kesklinn
 Carcassonne, France

Tartu

 Bærum, Norway
 Deventer, Netherlands

 Frederiksberg, Denmark
 Hafnarfjörður, Iceland
 Hämeenlinna, Finland
 Kaunas, Lithuania
 Lüneburg, Germany

 Riga, Latvia
 Salisbury, United States
 Tampere, Finland
 Turku, Finland
 Uppsala, Sweden
 Veszprém, Hungary

Tartu Parish
 Jyväskylä, Finland

Tõrva

 Baranivka, Ukraine
 Essunga, Sweden

 Hemsedal, Norway
 Grantsville, United States
 Laihia, Finland
 Lazdijai, Lithuania
 Łuków, Poland

Türi is a member of the Douzelage, a town twinning association of towns across the European Union. Türi also has several other twin towns.

Douzelage
 Agros, Cyprus
 Altea, Spain
 Asikkala, Finland
 Bad Kötzting, Germany
 Bellagio, Italy
 Bundoran, Ireland
 Chojna, Poland
 Granville, France
 Holstebro, Denmark
 Houffalize, Belgium
 Judenburg, Austria
 Kőszeg, Hungary
 Marsaskala, Malta
 Meerssen, Netherlands
 Niederanven, Luxembourg
 Oxelösund, Sweden
 Preveza, Greece
 Rokiškis, Lithuania
 Rovinj, Croatia
 Sesimbra, Portugal
 Sherborne, England, United Kingdom
 Sigulda, Latvia
 Siret, Romania
 Škofja Loka, Slovenia
 Sušice, Czech Republic
 Tryavna, Bulgaria
 Zvolen, Slovakia
Other
 Åmål, Sweden
 Frogn, Norway
 Ingå, Finland
 Karkkila, Finland
 Loimaa, Finland
 Prienai, Lithuania
 Säkylä, Finland
 Siuntio, Finland

V
Väike-Maarja

 Hausjärvi, Finland
 Sirdal, Norway
 Sonkajärvi, Finland

Valga

 Durbuy, Belgium
 Kobuleti, Georgia
 Kobylnica, Poland 
 Kościelisko, Poland
 Marijampolė, Lithuania
 Oakland, United States
 Orimattila, Finland
 Östhammar, Sweden
 Tvrdošín, Slovakia
 Valka, Latvia

Viimsi

 Barleben, Germany
 Porvoo, Finland
 Ramat Yishai, Israel
 Ski, Norway
 Sulejówek, Poland
 Täby, Sweden

Viljandi

 Ahrensburg, Germany
 Cumberland, United States
 Eslöv, Sweden
 Frostburg, United States
 Härnösand, Sweden
 Kretinga, Lithuania
 Porvoo, Finland
 Telavi, Georgia
 Ternopil, Ukraine
 Valmiera, Latvia

Vinni

 Ljusdal, Sweden
 Panevėžys District Municipality, Lithuania
 Tuusula, Finland

Viru-Nigula

 Akmenė, Lithuania
 Dobele, Latvia
 Comrat, Moldova
 Criuleni District, Moldova
 Karvia, Finland

Võru

 Alūksne, Latvia
 Bad Segeberg, Germany
 Chambray-lès-Tours, France
 Härryda, Sweden
 Iisalmi, Finland
 Joniškis, Lithuania
 Kaniv, Ukraine
 Laitila, Finland
 Landskrona, Sweden
 Pechorsky District, Russia
 Smolyan, Bulgaria
 Suwałki, Poland

References

Estonia
Estonia geography-related lists
Cities and towns in Estonia
Populated places in Estonia
Foreign relations of Estonia